
Gmina Dobra is an urban-rural gmina (administrative district) in Łobez County, West Pomeranian Voivodeship, in north-western Poland.

Villages
Apart from the town of Dobra, Gmina Dobra contains the villages and settlements of Anielino, Bienice, Błądkowo, Dobropole, Grzęzienko, Grzęzno, Krzemienna, Tucze, Wojtaszyce, Wrześno and Zapłocie.

Neighbouring gminas
Gmina Dobra is bordered by the gminas of Chociwel, Maszewo, Nowogard, Radowo Małe and Węgorzyno.

References
Polish official population figures 2006

Dobra
Łobez County